Darshan Jariwala (born 29 September 1958) is an Indian actor who works in Hindi films, television and stage. He won the National Film Award for Best Supporting Actor for Gandhi, My Father. He is popular for his show in which he was seen as Chedilal Chaturvedi in the show Saas Bina Sasural which aired on Sony Entertainment Television (India) between 18 October 2010 to 6 September. He is currently seen on Sony Set's show Sargam Ki Sadhe Satii which is the sequel of his popular show Saas Bina Sasural in which he is essaying the character of Chedilal Awasthi, the female protagonist Anjali Tatrari's father-in-law and has garnered appreciation for his character and performance.

Biography 
Jariwala is the son of veteran Gujarati actress Leela Jariwala and Vidyasagar Jariwala. He has acted in films as well as on Indian television. One of his most remembered Gujarati TV serials is Narsinh Mehta, about the saint poet and devotee of Krishna. His role of Mahatma Gandhi in the 2007 film Gandhi, My Father put him on the international map.

His Gujarati plays include Hatheli Par BaadBaaki, Patro Mitro, Mulraj Mansion and Andhalo Pato. He acted in a Hindi play, Uncle Samjha Karo and in English theatre Going Solo 2. He ventured into the new age mainstream Gujarati cinema with the Abhishek Jain-directed Bey Yaar, released in 2014.

His company Leela Theatres has coproduced an English Play, Salt & Pepper, starring him, Mandira Bedi, Kuki Grewal and Vikram Kochar, written and directed by Vikranth Pawar, and produced the English comedy Your Place Or Mine? and Gujarati double bill Ramesh Aakhi Raat, comprising two one-act plays based on Ramesh Parekh's writings.

He has acted in Hindi films like Honeymoon Travels Pvt Ltd, Guru, Aap Kaa Surroor, Phata Poster Nikla Hero and Humshakals.

Feroz Abbas Khan (director of Gandhi, My Father and a veteran theatre personality) had approached him for Gandhi's role in his famous play Mahatma v/s Gandhi. But due to date problems, the actor had to let go of the project. However, Feroz was bent on casting him as Gandhi and again approached him for Gandhi, My Father, which finally materialized.

Personal life 
In 1982, he married Indian television personality Apara Mehta, with whom he has one daughter.  They have been living separately since 2003 to personal differences. Since 2010, he is in a live in relationship with Anahita Jahanbaksh Italia.

Filmography

Television 
Narsinh Mehta (unknown) as Narsinh Mehta
Kya Baat Hai (1997) as Ram Dayal Mehta
Chandan Ka Palna Resham Ki Dori as Nirang Bhimani on Zee tv
Kitne Kool Hai Hum (2002)
Saas Bina Sasural (2010–2012) as Cheddilal Anandilal Chaturvedi
Adaalat (2012) as K. D. Pathak's father
Maan Na Maan Main Tera Mehmaan as Shakuni (cameo)
Muh Boli Shaadi (2015) as Ashok Tiwari
Ek Tha Raja Ek Thi Rani (2015) as Gayatri's father
Baa Bahoo Aur Baby (2006–2007) as Dr.  Akhilesh Jha
Permanent Roommates (Season 2) (2016)The Good Karma Hospital (2017) as Ram Nair
 Sargam Ki Sadhe Satii'' (2021) as Chedilal Awasthi

References

External links 

 
 Audio interview of Darshan Jariwala www. speakbindas. com/audio-interview-of-darshan-jariwala/

Living people
Indian male film actors
Indian male stage actors
Indian male television actors
Male actors in Gujarati-language films
Gujarati people
People from Gujarat
Best Supporting Actor National Film Award winners
Male actors in Hindi cinema
1958 births